The Vibrant Arena at The MARK, formerly known as The MARK of the Quad Cities, the iWireless Center, and the TaxSlayer Center is a 12,000-seat multi-purpose arena located in Moline, Illinois. The facility opened in May 1993, under the name The MARK of the Quad Cities with the singer Neil Diamond as the opening act.  The facility was renamed as the TaxSlayer Center on October 1, 2017. The arena started using its current name on September 1, 2022.

It is the home to the revived Quad City Steamwheelers of the Indoor Football League and the Quad City Storm in the Southern Professional Hockey League.

Sporting events
The arena has hosted NCAA Division I college basketball games (including the Mid-Continent Conference men's basketball tournament from 1996 to 1999) in addition to several NHL and NBA exhibition contests. The Missouri Valley Conference has hosted their Women's Basketball Tournament 2016, 2017, and 2018.  The now-defunct Quad City Thunder basketball team played all their home games at the TaxSlayer Center from 1993 until the Continental Basketball Association folded eight years later.

Hockey has also been played at the arena since 1995. The Quad City Mallards of the United Hockey League played the first 12 years. They were replaced by the Quad City Flames of the American Hockey League for two seasons before moving to Abbotsford, British Columbia. After the Flames left, the Quad City Mallards were reincarnated in 2009 and played home games at the arena until 2018. In May 2018, two months after the Quad City Mallards ceased operations, TaxSlayer Center director Scott Mullen and former Mallards' owner Howard Cornfield announced a Southern Professional Hockey League team called the Quad City Storm would play the 2018–19 season.

In 2009, Western Illinois University's club hockey team, the Fighting Leathernecks, began playing there for four games per season.

From 2000 to 2009, the arena played host to arena football as the home of the af2's Quad City Steamwheelers, who won the first two Arena Cup championships in league history (the arena hosted both games at the time). The Steamwheelers came back in 2018 in Champions Indoor Football (CIF) before joining the Indoor Football League (IFL) for the 2019 season.

Configuration 
The arena seats up to 12,000 for end-stage concerts along with center-stage concerts. It takes only six hours to convert the center into a theater (called The Theater at the TaxSlayer Center).  The seating capacity is 3,000 for theater shows, including Broadway shows, concerts and family shows; and 6,000 for amphitheater concerts.

The center has also hosted professional wrestling events, including the 1997 Great American Bash and 2015 King of the Ring pay-per-views, and numerous broadcasts of World Wrestling Entertainment programming, including Raw, ECW and SmackDown. The arena also hosted WWE The Shield's Final Chapter on April 21, 2019.

The attendance record was set in 1996, when more than 12,000 people viewed Neil Diamond's concert.

Naming rights
In August 2005, iWireless (formerly Iowa Wireless, a T-Mobile affiliate), announced a 10-year agreement with The MARK (former name) and the Illinois Quad City Civic Center Authority to secure naming rights to the arena.  The name change to the "iWireless Center" occurred July 19, 2007.  The naming rights agreement with iWireless was intended to be extended for two more years in July 2017. However, a new sponsor, TaxSlayer, an online tax and finance firm, bought the rights in 2017. In September of that same year, TaxSlayer Chief Marketing Officer Chris Moloney announced at a press conference that the company had signed a long-term agreement to be the title sponsor of the venue, which would now be called the TaxSlayer Center beginning on October 1, 2017. On August 17, 2022, the arena announced a new naming rights deal with Vibrant Credit Union. The new name of the arena, Vibrant Arena at The MARK, will take effect on September 1, 2022.

See also
 List of convention centers in the United States

References

External links
Official Site

Basketball venues in Illinois
Buildings and structures in Rock Island County, Illinois
Buildings and structures in Moline, Illinois
College basketball venues in the United States
Continental Basketball Association venues
Convention centers in Illinois
Indoor arenas in Illinois
Indoor ice hockey venues in Illinois
Quad City Flames
Quad City Thunder
Sports venues in the Quad Cities
Tourist attractions in the Quad Cities
Tourist attractions in Rock Island County, Illinois
1993 establishments in Illinois